Senator Gallup may refer to:

David Gallup (1808–1882), Connecticut State Senate
Harvey A. Gallup (1869–1946), Massachusetts State Senate